The following are the national records in athletics in Syria maintained by Syrian Arab Athletic Federation (SAAF).

Outdoor

Key to tables:

h = hand timing

X = unratified due to doping violation

Men

Women

Indoor

Men

Women

References
General
World Athletics Statistic Handbook 2022: National Outdoor Records
World Athletics Statistic Handbook 2022: National Indoor Records
Specific

External links
SAAF web site

Syria
Athletics
Records
Athletics